The Chili Bowl is a planned college football bowl game to be played in Cincinnati, Ohio at TQL Stadium. The college conferences that have tie-ins with the bowl are yet to be determined.

References

College football bowls
Annual sporting events in the United States
American football in Ohio